The Judge's List (2021) is a legal-suspense novel written by American author John Grisham, published by Doubleday on October 19, 2021.

It builds on characters introduced in Grisham's 2016 novel The Whistler, including Florida Board on Judicial Conduct investigator Lacy Stoltz.

Plot 
Three years after the events of The Whistler, Lacy Stolz is tired of her work as an investigator for the Florida Board on Judicial Conduct. But when Jeri Crosby nervously approaches her, Lacy discovers that a sitting judge is a murderer. She's reluctant to get involved, but Jeri is obsessed with bringing the man to justice.  

Jeri's father was one of the victims 20 years earlier, although his case has never been solved. She has studied the judge for two decades, and has discovered other victims in the process.  

While the serial killer's guilt is never really in doubt, finding evidence to convict him is a much bigger challenge, because he knows the law, and is always one step ahead of law enforcement. He has a list that includes the names of all his targets who have wronged him in some way, and Lacy must help Jeri establish his guilt without either of them becoming his next victim.

Reception 
The novel debuted at number one on The New York Times fiction best-seller list for the week ending October 23, 2021.

Kirkus Reviews called the novel a "shiny bauble of mayhem sure to please Grisham's many fans."

References 

2021 American novels
American crime novels
American thriller novels
Doubleday (publisher) books
Legal thriller novels
Novels by John Grisham
Novels set in Florida